The Nazca Ridge is a submarine ridge, located on the Nazca Plate off the west coast of South America. The Nazca Ridge began subducting obliquely to the collision margin at 11°S, approximately 11.2 Ma, and the current subduction location is 15°S. The ridge is composed of abnormally thick basaltic ocean crust, averaging 18 ±3 km thick. This crust is buoyant, resulting in flat slab subduction under Peru. This flat slab subduction has been associated with the uplift of Pisco Basin and the cessation of Andes volcanism and the uplift of the Fitzcarrald Arch on the South American continent approximately 4 Ma.

Morphology 
The gradient of the slopes is 1-2 degrees. This is abnormally thick for oceanic crust.

Formation 
Based on basalt ages, the portion of the Nazca Ridge that is currently exposed dates from 31 ± 1 Ma at the Peru-Chile trench, to 23 ± 1 Ma where the Nazca Ridge and Easter Seamount Chain are adjacent. Basalt composition has also been used to show that the Nazca Ridge and Easter Seamount Chain formed from the same magma source, with the formation of the Easter Seamount Chain occurring after the Nazca Plate changed direction. Formation began along the Pacific-Farallon/Nazca spreading center, and has been attributed to hot spot volcanism. There is some debate as to where this hot spot was originally located however, with locations near Easter Island and Salas y Gomez both being proposed. The ridge is primarily composed of mid-ocean ridge basalt, which erupted on the Nazca Plate when the plate was already 5-13 Ma old. Based on isotopic ratios and rare earth element composition, it is estimated that the magma was sourced at approximately 95 km depth from a 7% partial melt. The Nazca Ridge has a conjugate feature on the Pacific Plate, the Tuamotu Plateau. Magnetic anomalies have shown that there was symmetrical spreading at the Pacific-Farallon/Nazca center, so the Tuamotu Plateau can be used as a proxy for the pre-subducted Nazca Ridge geometry.

Subduction and migration history 
The Nazca Plate began subducting into the Peru-Chile trench 11.2 Ma at 11°S. Due to the oblique orientation of the ridge to the Nazca-South American plate collision zone, the ridge has migrated south along the active margin to its current location at 15°S. Based on Tuamotu Plateau mirror relationship, it is estimated that  of the Nazca Ridge has already subducted.

Continental margin interaction 
The ridge is buoyant, resulting in flat slab subduction of the Nazca Plate underneath Peru. Buoyancy is related to crustal age, and the buoyancy effect can be seen in oceanic crust aged from 30-40 Ma. The Nazca Plate is dated to 45 Ma where it subducts into the Peru-Chile trench. The extreme thickness of the buoyant ridge is responsible for the flat slab subduction of the older underlying plate. Modeling has shown that this type of subduction is only concurrent with submarine ridges, and accounts for approximately 10% of convergent boundaries.

Large magnitude earthquakes occur in association with the area around the Nazca Ridge subduction zone, known at the Peru megathrust. These include, but are not limited to, a magnitude 8.1 earthquake in 1942, a magnitude 8.0 earthquake in 1970, a magnitude 7.7 earthquake in 1996, a magnitude 8.4 earthquake in 2001, and a magnitude 8.0 earthquake in 2007. Earthquake records for this area of subduction go back to 1586. All of these ruptures were located either on the coast of Peru or within the Peru-Chile Trench between 9°S and 18°S, coincidental with the subducting Nazca Ridge, and include both intraplate and interplate rupturing. No large earthquakes have been located between 14°S and 15.5°S, where the bathymetric high of the ridge is subducting. Interplate earthquakes do not occur in direct conjunction with the Nazca Ridge.

However, this is a tectonic erosion margin. There is no accretionary wedge forming in the trench, and what sediment is found there is from continental sources, based on fossil assemblage. The calcareous ooze blanketing Nazca Ridge is completely subducted.

The forearc basin of Pisco located above the subducting ridge has experienced uplift since the Late Pliocene or Pleistocene an uplift that is attributed to the subduction of the Nazca Ridge.

Influence in Amazon tectonics
The flat slab subduction associated with the Nazca Ridge has been linked to the cessation of volcanism in the Andes Mountains at about 4 Ma. Studies indicate that the uplift of the arch also began 4 Ma.

The uplift of the Fitzcarrald Arch intersects with the Andes Mountains where there is a shift from high-gradient topography to the low-gradient Amazon Basin. This topographic uplift effectively divides the Amazon drainage basin into three sub-basins, the Ucayali to the northwest, the Acre to the northeast, and the Madre De Dios to the southeast. It's hypothesized that significant modifications to sedimentary, erosional, and hydrological processes have resulted from the uplift of the Fitzcarrald Arch. Evolutionary paths for freshwater fish began to diverge in the Amazon sub-basins approximately 4 Ma as well. The uplift of the Fitzcarrald Arch could also be the catalyst that lead to these differing evolutionary paths, effectively isolating fish populations from each other.

References

External links

Underwater ridges of the Pacific Ocean
Oligocene volcanism
Geology of Peru